Daran (also Romanized as Dārān;) is a city and capital of Faridan County, Isfahan Province, Iran. At the 2010 census, its population was 40,930, in 5,763 families.

References

Populated places in Faridan County

Cities in Isfahan Province